A buddam (also known as a chow) is an obsolete unit of mass used in the pearl trade in Mumbai (formerly Bombay) in the 19th century. A buddam equalled 1/1600 chow, or 1/16 docra.

See also
List of customary units of measurement in South Asia

References

Units of mass
Customary units in India
Obsolete units of measurement